Hersi may refer to: 

Youssouf Hersi, Dutch footballer
Mohamud Muse Hersi, Somali politician
Amina Moghe Hersi, Somali entrepreneur
Hersi Aman legendary 3rd Sultan of the Habr Yunis
Khalil Abdulkadir Farah Hersi (1946-2005), Somali poet
Hersi Matmuja, Albanian singer
Hussein Hersi, businessman in Columbus,Ohio